The ECW Pennsylvania State Championship was a short-lived title in ECW when it was called Eastern Championship Wrestling. It was also known as the NWA Pennsylvania Heavyweight Championship and existed in 1993.

Reigns

References

Extreme Championship Wrestling championships
State professional wrestling championships